A referendum on allowing unmarried women to have fertility treatment was held in Slovenia on 17 June 2001. The proposal was rejected by 73.3% of voters, with a turnout of only 35.7%.

Results

References

2001 referendums
Fertility treatment referendum, 2001
Fertility treatment referendum, 2001
June 2001 events in Europe